This is a tally of newspaper and magazine endorsements in the 2006 Canadian federal election:

Endorsing the Conservative Party

Endorsing the Liberals

Endorsing the Bloc Québécois

Endorsing the Greens

References

2006 Canadian federal election
Canada 2006
Federal election, 2006